The Phillips Gadabout was one of a number of mopeds produced in the early 1960s by Phillips Cycles of Birmingham, England.  The Gadabout was the more expensive model, boasting two-speed manual transmission and telescopic front fork suspension.  The Gadabout had a pressed-steel frame, not unlike the German NSU Quickly  whereas the more basic Phillips Panda, had a tubular bicycle-style frame.  After Phillips Cycles became part of the Raleigh Industries/Tube Investments group, the Gadabout became a French Mótobecane Mobylette badged as a Phillips.

Mopeds